Walter Boos (1928–1996) was a German film editor and director.

Selected filmography

Editor
 Everything Will Be Better in the Morning (1948)
 Martina (1949)
 Who Drove the Grey Ford? (1950)
 Hanna Amon (1951)
 Monks, Girls and Hungarian Soldiers (1952)
 Stars Over Colombo (1953)
 The Blue Hour (1953)
 The Prisoner of the Maharaja (1954)
 08/15 (1954)
 Fear (1954)
 The Golden Plague (1954)
 Prisoners of Love (1954)
 Fruit in the Neighbour's Garden (1956)
 The Old Forester House (1956)
 Where the Ancient Forests Rustle (1956)
 The Crammer (1958)
 Dorothea Angermann (1959)
 My Schoolfriend (1960)
 Town Without Pity (1961)
 Max the Pickpocket (1962)
 He Can't Stop Doing It (1962)
 My Daughter and I (1963)
 Coffin from Hong Kong (1964)
 Situation Hopeless... But Not Serious (1965)
 Schulmädchen-Report (1970)

Director
 Nurse Report (1972)
 Love in 3-D (1973)
 The East Frisian Report (1973)
 Charley's Nieces (1974)
 Revenge of the East Frisians (1974)
 Inn of the Sinful Daughters (1978)

References

Bibliography
 Peter Brunette. Roberto Rossellini. University of California Press, 1996.

External links

1928 births
1996 deaths
Film people from Munich